Đơn Dương is a district (huyện) of Lâm Đồng province in the Central Highlands region of Vietnam.

As of 2003 the district had a population of 92,260. The district covers an area of 612 km². The district capital lies at Thạnh Mỹ.

References

Districts of Lâm Đồng province